Sudhakar Pandey (1927-2003) was an Indian politician. He was elected to the Lok Sabha,  the lower house of the Parliament of India from Chandauli, Uttar Pradesh in 1971 as a member of the Indian National Congress. He was a member of the Rajya Sabha, the Upper house of the Parliament of India from Uttar Pradesh from 1980 to 1986.

References

External links
Official biographical sketch in Parliament of India website

India MPs 1971–1977
Indian National Congress politicians
1927 births
2003 deaths
Lok Sabha members from Uttar Pradesh
Rajya Sabha members from Uttar Pradesh
Politicians from Varanasi
People from Chandauli district